The University College of Management Studies is a private university college in Accra and Kumasi, Ghana. The school is affiliated with the School of Business of Kwame Nkrumah University of Science and Technology, Kumasi and the University of Education Winneba, Kumasi Campus.

Establishment
The university was formed from the Institute of Management Studies.  The institute was established in 1974 and served as a tutorial school for candidates for professional qualifications in Marketing from the Chartered Institute of Marketing, Accounting from the Association of Chartered Certified Accountants and Purchasing and Supply from the Chartered Institute of Purchasing & Supply.

Mission
Its mission is to create an environment and facilities which will inculcate the requisite competencies and attitude in its products. Such professional and academic competencies will enable them to provide productive service to the society.

Vision
The vision of the College is to become a reputable management and research institution of higher learning which will develop academic and moral excellence and so hold its own in a competitive global environment.

Departments
University College of Management Studies has 3 main departments; namely, Accounting, Finance & Marketing, Human Resource Management and Procurement & Supply Chain Management Departments.

Department of Accounting, Finance & Marketing
This Department offers a first Degree program in the areas of Accounting, Banking & Finance and Marketing.

Bsc. Accounting
The program consists of the following courses:
 Financial Accounting I-IV, 
 Taxation
 Cost Accounting I & II
 Auditing & Assurance
 International Accounting
 Financial Reporting & Analysis
 Company & Partnership Law
 Management Accounting
 Managerial Economics
 Research Methods

Bsc. Banking & Finance
Some of the courses offered under this program include:
 Economics in Banking
 Monetary & Financial Systems
 Business Finance I & II
 Law Relating to Banking
 Investments
 Practice of Banking I & II
 Marketing of Financial Services
 Banking Operations & Ethics
 Managerial Economics
 Finance of International Trade
 Business Ethics
 Managerial Accounting
 Managerial Economics
 Entrepreneurship

Bsc. Marketing
Some of the courses offered include:
 Marketing Management
 Marketing of Services
 Marketing Environment
 New Product Development
 Sales Management
 Retail Marketing Management
 Strategic Marketing Management: Planning Control
 Integrated Marketing Communications
 Marketing Research
 Organizational Re-Engineering
 Business Ethics
 Managerial Accounting
 Managerial Economics
 Entrepreneurship

Department of Human Resource Management
This Department offers the following courses:
 Human Resource Training Development
 Industrial Psychology
 Human Behaviour in Organization
 Appraisal & Performance Management
 Human Resource Information System
 Strategic Human Resource Management
 Labour Economics
 Managerial Economics
 Business Organisation
 Employment Laws & Practice
 Human Resource Management
 Entrepreneurship
 Industrial Relations & Labour Law
 Business Ethics

Department of Procurement and Supply Chain Management
Courses offered in this Department include:
 Monitoring & Evaluation of Procurement Systems
 Procurement Planning & Budgetary Control I & II
 Research Methods
 Process & Procedures of Public Sector Procurement
 Supply & Material Management
 Business Organization & Process
 Project & Contract Management
 International Management
 Strategic Procurement
 Tactics & Operations in Purchasing & Supply
 Physical Distribution & Transportation
 Legal Aspect of Procurement
 Managerial Economics
 Business Analysis in Procurement
 Logistics Management
 Business Ethics
 Managerial Accounting
 Entrepreneurship

Accreditation
The university is accredited by the National Accreditation Board in 1998.

Affiliations
The university in May 2011, was formally affiliated with the Kwame Nkrumah University of Science and Technology.

See also
List of universities in Ghana

References

Universities in Ghana
Educational institutions established in 1974
1974 establishments in Ghana